is a passenger railway station in the town of Ōra, Gunma, Japan, operated by the private railway operator Tōbu Railway. It is numbered "TI-43".

Lines

Station layout
The station consists of a single side platform serving traffic in both directions.

Adjacent stations

History

Shinozuka Station was opened as a station of the Koizumi Line operated by Jōshū Railway company on March 12, 1917. The Koizumi Line was purchased by Tōbu Railway in 1937. A new station building was built in 2006.

From March 17, 2012, station numbering was introduced on all Tōbu lines, with Shinozuka Station becoming "TI-43".

Passenger statistics
In fiscal 2019, the station was used by an average of 213 passengers daily (boarding passengers only).

Surrounding area
 
 Nagara Jinja
 Daishin-ji Temple

See also
List of railway stations in Japan

References

External links

  Tobu station information 
	

Tobu Koizumi Line
Stations of Tobu Railway
Railway stations in Gunma Prefecture
Railway stations in Japan opened in 1917
Ōra, Gunma